Wilson Benesch is a British company that designs and manufactures high-end audio equipment, like loudspeakers and turntables. Wilson Benesch was founded in 1989 in Sheffield, South Yorkshire, England. Today the company is regarded as an audio design companies in the United Kingdom. Wilson Benesch operates its entire design and manufacturing operation from Falcon House, an art-deco styled building in the North-West of the city and the original home of Batchelors, built in the 1930s.

Wilson Benesch's first product was the Wilson Benesch Turntable launched in 1991. Since then Wilson Benesch has consistently developed turntables, loudspeakers, and furniture. The company has frequently used carbon fibre composites and metal alloys within its manufacturing process.

Despite its name, there are no relations between Wilson Benesch and the US loudspeaker manufacturer Wilson Audio.

In-house design and manufacturing 
Wilson Benesch states that it manufactures almost 90% of all product components in-house from raw materials. Design work is completed using Dassault Systemes three-dimensional CAD/CAM software, with the company operating machinery, including but not limited to CNC machines for metal alloy components and Vacuum Resin Transfer Moulding Machinery for the production of carbon fibre composite components.

In 2012 Wilson Benesch took out a loan with Finance Yorkshire, who provide seedcorn, loan and equity investments via the UK Government, European Regional Development Fund and European Investment Bank to help businesses grow and develop. The loan allowed Wilson Benesch to expand its manufacturing operation and commence end-to-end production of its new reference loudspeaker, the Cardinal.

Technology, research and development 
Research and development (R&D) has been central to the development of Wilson Benesch. From the outset, finance and subsequent earnings from sales of the initial products were invested in new product development.

In addition, Wilson Benesch has secured funding through grant applications to Her Majesty's Government for innovative, high-risk, research and development projects. These projects have drawn on collaborative partnerships with scientists in a number of fields and from a number of universities, including, University of Leeds, University of Oxford, University of Sheffield and Sheffield Hallam University, as well as other technology companies and institutes such as the Advanced Manufacturing Park and Hypetex. Since its foundation, Wilson Benesch has been successful in six separate grant funding applications, accounting for more than £600,000 of publicly funded research and development. These programs have often been conducted by the company as part of a match funded agreement, with Wilson Benesch committing as much as 50% of the total R&D budget.

Noteworthy innovations resulting directly from grant funded research:
 In 1989, Wilson Benesch was awarded its first grant. The application focused on plans to develop a new turntable that would use new materials technology to advance performance. £25,000 was awarded to Wilson Benesch by the Department for Trade and Industry (DTi) under the SMART Award scheme designed to fund innovation. The direct outcome of the SMART Award funding was the company's first two products, the Wilson Benesch Turntable and the A.C.T. One Tonearm. The Wilson Benesch Turntable featured an advanced composite sub-chassis, constructed from a Nomex core with a carbon fibre skin. The A.C.T. One Tonearm was constructed from carbon fibre composite in a hyperbolic tube.
 In 1997, Wilson Benesch was awarded a second DTi Grant under the SMART Award scheme. Wilson Benesch were awarded £250,000 for an application that outlined a proposal to develop another dynamic drive unit based around materials technology previously not used in drive unit design. The project was code named 'The Bishop Project' by Wilson Benesch. The outcome was the company's Tactic Multirole Drive Unit. The drive unit features a Neodymium Rare Earth Magnet and an Isotactic Polypropylene cone that was developed through collaborative research with the University of Leeds and Professor Ian Ward. The first product which used this drive technology was the Bishop loudspeaker in 1999. The drive technology was also subsequently used in the company's Odyssey Range and the Square Series.
 In 2003, Wilson Benesch was awarded its third DTi Grant under the SMART Award scheme. Wilson Benesch were awarded £186,000 for an application that outlined the development of a patentable drive unit design, capable of reproducing low frequency sound. The outcome was the company's Torus Infrasonic Generator. Wilson Benesch patented the design, electing to name it according to the designs unique motor design which has no spider to reset the drive unit cone to its resting position, instead the design introduced a new approach that used a push-pull drive design, with the resting position of the cone being determined by two electromagnets.
 In 2008, Wilson Benesch won its fourth DTi Grant under the SMART Award scheme. Wilson Benesch were awarded £146,000 for an application that outlined the development of a patentable analogue replay system. The company entitled the research and development project, the Mondrian Project, and have published a number of project reports, but has announced no outcomes or products directly from the research project to date.

Carbon fibre and carbon nanotube composite technology
Since Wilson Benesch was founded in 1989, the company has consistently developed audio products based around the innovative application of carbon fibre composite materials technology. Wilson Benesch uses carbon fibre composite materials technology to extract the unique stiffness and damping properties of the material. The composite material proved to provide high specific stiffness and internal damping, minimising distortion. Wilson Benesch often use geometric forms within the design of composite structures to optimise this stiffness, often reducing the weight of the component in the process and reducing the number of flat surfaces in the finished product that can create problems with distortion and standing waves.

Noteworthy carbon composite innovations and introductions to the audio industry:
 In the 1990s, the company's first three products, the Wilson Benesch Turntable, the A.C.T. One Tonearm and the A.C.T. One Loudspeaker, were developed through collaboration with carbon composites engineer Neil Humpston, who had been part of the team that helped develop the Rolls-Royce RB-211 Jet Engine carbon composite fan blades. Each of these products featured an innovative carbon fibre composite component. 
 In the 2000s, Wilson Benesch worked with Pera Technology in Melton Mowbray to develop a new carbon fibre composite component using resin transfer moulding technology. The direct result was an innovative loudspeaker cabinet, constructed from carbon fibre composite, moulded into a curved u-section monocoque. Wilson Benesch named this component the Advanced Composite Technology (A.C.T.) Monocoque. The first product line to be manufactured by Wilson Benesch using this component was the Odyssey Range, which was announced with the launch of the Discovery loudspeaker in 2001.
 In 2006, Wilson Benesch announced the Torus Infrasonic Generator. The Torus features an 18" carbon fibre  polyethylene terephthalate cone formed from an innovative fabric weave allowing multi-axis layup of the material.
 In 2007, Wilson Benesch undertook a collaborative research project with Sheffield Hallam University with the aim of introducing carbon nanotechnology into the company's manufacturing process. In 2008, Wilson Benesch announced the Nanotube One tonearm. The company claims that this was the first tonearm in the world to be constructed from a carbon fibre  nanotube matrix. 
 In 2014, Wilson Benesch announced another carbon fibre  nanotube composite component. Wilson Benesch named the technology a 'Carbon-Nanotech Enclosure'. The Carbon-Nanotech Enclosure was developed through a collaborative research project with the Advanced Manufacturing Research Centre in Sheffield. The company states that the component bestows numerous performance benefits, principally optimising air volume within the loudspeaker cabinet and managing energy generated inside the loudspeaker cabinet.
 In 2016, Wilson Benesch announced the introduction of the world's first loudspeaker constructed from coloured carbon fibre, with the launch of the A.C.T. One Evolution P1 loudspeaker at the Munich HIGH END audio exhibition. The loudspeaker has been built in partnership with Hypetex, a British company who have developed a patented manufacturing process for coloured carbon fibre manufacturing.

Proprietary drive technology
Wilson Benesch developed its first drive technology in house through the Bishop Project, resulting in the Tactic Multirole Drive Unit. The Tactic Drive Unit allowed Wilson Benesch to use the same drive unit for its midrange and bass drive units. In addition the Wilson Benesch introduced an unusual adaptation of the Isobaric loudspeaker configuration in the Bishop loudspeaker in 1999. The design featured two Tactic Drive Units in a clamshell or push-pull formation, the external drive unit has its rear magnet outside the cabinet. Wilson Benesch called this formation the Isobaric Drive System.

Since the Tactic Drive Unit, Wilson Benesch has introduced the Wide Bandwidth One drive unit, with the launch of the Wide Bandwidth Collection in 2007. And following this the Tactic II drive unit, which the company refers to as the third iteration of the original Tactic.

Wilson Benesch has also developed its own tweeter technology for reproduction of high frequency sound. The company introduced its tweeter with the launch of its current reference loudspeaker line, the Geometry Series. It calls the tweeter the Semisphere Tweeter.

Products

Geometry Series
The company's reference loudspeaker line. Features the company's latest drive unit technology and all the designs are based upon metal alloy and carbon fibre composite material construction. The series consists of, Vertex, Vector, Fulcrum, Discovery II, A.C.T. One Evolution, Endeavour and the flagship of the series, the Cardinal. The Torus Infrasonic Generator was brought into this product line in 2016.

Square series II
The Square Series II is constructed from more traditional wood based materials technology and rectilinear forms. The series incorporates drive technology from the Odyssey Series. The series consists of, Square One, Square Two, Square Three, Square Centre and the flagship of the series, the Square Five.

Analogue collection 
Wilson Benesch's oldest product line, incorporating all analogue replay systems including turntables and tonearms. The series consists of, Circle 25 Turntable, A.C.T. 25 Tonearm, Nanotube One Tonearm.

Hi-Fi Furniture 
Wilson Benesch currently manufactures a Hi-Fi rack called the R1 Hi-Fi Rack.

See also
 List of phonograph manufacturers

References

External links
Official site

Loudspeaker manufacturers
Phonograph manufacturers
Audio equipment manufacturers of the United Kingdom
Manufacturing companies established in 1989
Manufacturing companies based in Sheffield
1989 establishments in England